Central Coast Ferries is an Australian ferry operator on the Central Coast of New South Wales.

History
Central Coast Ferries was established in 1991  by the Conway family as a ferry operator on Brisbane Water.

Services
Central Coast Ferries operates a service from Woy Woy to Empire Bay via Saratoga and Davistown under contract to Transport for New South Wales. It previously ran a service from Woy Woy to Ettalong Beach that commenced in 2006. In May 2016, a monthly service was introduced from Gosford to Patonga.

Fleet
As at March 2018, Central Coast Ferries operated three vessels:
MV Codock II (built 1945), purchased 2006, built for Royal Australian Navy, purchased by Cockatoo Docks & Engineering Company, Sydney 1947
MV Saratoga (built 2003)
MV Sorrento (built 2003), purchased from Belmont Christian College, Lake Macquarie 2015

References

Ferry companies of New South Wales
Transport on the Central Coast (New South Wales)
Transport companies established in 1991
1991 establishments in Australia